Blashfield is a surname. Notable people with the surname include:

Edwin Blashfield (1848-1936), American pianist and muralist
Jean Blashfield Black, American game designer
John Marriott Blashfield (1811–1882), British property developer
Jim Blashfield (born 1944), American filmmaker